Hohn is a municipality in the district of Rendsburg-Eckernförde, in Schleswig-Holstein, Germany.

Hohn is located to the south of the Königshügel and Lohe-Föhrden municipalities, but north of Friedrichsgraben, Sophienhamm and Elsdorf-Westermühlen, and west of the municipality of Fockbek.

References

Municipalities in Schleswig-Holstein
Rendsburg-Eckernförde